Sunset Football Club is a football club based in George Town, Cayman Islands, which currently plays in the Cayman Premier League. Its home stadium is the 2,500-capacity T.E. McField Sports Centre.

Sunset Football Club was founded in 1982 by current club President Robert Jenkinson. The club is one of the oldest in the Cayman Islands. The Mens Team plays in the Cayman Premier League under Head Coach Gareth Thacker and his assistant Denis Rowe. The club runs both boys and girls teams from Under 11 to Under 19 and has a successful Saturday and Sunday morning academy for ages 5-10 in both the boys and girls thanks to the voluntary coaching headed up by Gisela Gamba, Paul Macey, Neil Gray and James Kennedy plus many other coaching volunteers. The Successful Ladies Team managed by Alan Purvis alongside the Masters Team completes the full array of Squads at Sunset FC.

References

Football clubs in the Cayman Islands
George Town, Cayman Islands